EP+6 is a compilation album by Scottish post-rock group Mogwai, released in Japan in 2000 through Toy's Factory, and later in the UK in 2001 through Chemikal Underground.

Overview
EP+6 brings together all three of Mogwai's previous EPs: 1997's 4 Satin, 1998's No Education = No Future (Fuck the Curfew), and 1999's EP, in a Remastered and Enhanced CD, featuring the music video for "Stanley Kubrick". The Japanese version also included a music video for "Xmas Steps", whilst the UK version included a Screensaver, images of Mogwai, and reviews. The cover of EP+6 is similar to the cover of EP, as they both feature the  same image, a movie still entitled "Watertower" by Scottish photographer Neale Smith, of a water tower in East Kilbride, South Lanarkshire, Scotland.

Track listing
All songs were written by Mogwai, except "Now You're Taken", lyrics and vocals by Aidan Moffat; Barry Burns was not in Mogwai for tracks 1–6.
 "Superheroes of BMX" – 8:05
 "Now You're Taken" – 7:00
 "Stereodee" – 13:39
 "Xmas Steps" – 11:13
 "Rollerball" – 3:47
 "Small Children in the Background" – 6:51
 "Stanley Kubrick" – 4:19
 "Christmas Song" – 3:26
 "Burn Girl Prom Queen" – 8:33
 "Rage:Man" – 5:05

Personnel
 Stuart Braithwaite – guitar, keyboard, percussion
 Dominic Aitchison – bass guitar, guitar
 Martin Bulloch – drums
 John Cummings – guitar, piano
 Barry Burns – guitar, keyboard
 Aidan Moffat – vocals on "Now You're Taken"
 Luke Sutherland – violin on "Xmas Steps"
 Lee Cohen – vocals on "Stanley Kubrick"
 The Cowdenbeath Brass Band – brass on "Burn Girl Prom Queen"
 Andy Miller – producer on tracks 1, 6
 Jamie Harley – producer on "Now You're Taken"
 Paul Savage – producer on "Stereodee"
 Geoff Allan – producer on tracks 4–5
 Michael Brennan Jr. – producer on tracks 7–10
 Kevin Lynch – assistant producer on "Stanley Kubrick"
 Tony Doogan – assistant producer on tracks 8–10
 Willie Deans – assistant producer on tracks 8–10

Release history
EP+6 was originally released in Japan in 2000.

Notes

External links

Mogwai compilation albums
2001 compilation albums
Chemikal Underground compilation albums